The Ministry of Information and Communications Technology is a government ministry, responsible for postal services, telephones and information technology in Zimbabwe. The incbhlumbent is MONICA MUTSVANGWA. It oversees:
 Net*One
 TelOne
 Zimpost

Zimbabwe in the past 20 years between 200-2020 has seen internet penetration increase by 11,567%

References

Government of Zimbabwe
Communications in Zimbabwe
Zimbabwe
Zimbabwe